Three Yizo Yizo soundtrack albums were produced through CCP Records to accompany the teen drama TV Show Yizo Yizo. They mainly consist of Kwaito music.

Yizo Yizo
The first Yizo Yizo soundtrack was released in 2000. It was certified platinum by the Recording Industry of South Africa (RISA). This album was released on cassette tape as well as CD. Later, EMI released it to a streaming service.

Tracklist

 "Tlo Be Rele Daar" - Skeem
 "Yizo Yizo" - Kyllex
 "The Good And The Bad"	- E'Smile & Amu
 "Masukela	" - Kaybee
 "I Don't Want"	 - Ghetto Luv
 "Uzama U Kwenzani"	- O'Da Meesta
 "Mamgobhozi"	 - Kyllex, Mandoza & Too Short
 "Mi House" (Remix)	- E'Smile
 "Hurtin" - Ghetto Luv & E'Smile
 "Da Struggle Kontinues" - Prophets Of Da City 
 "Masukela (Remix)" - Kaybee

Certifications

Yizo Yizo 2

Yizo Yizo 2 was released in 2002. It was also certified platinum by the RISA.

Track listing

Accolades

Certifications

Yizo Yizo 3

Yizo Yizo 3 was released in 2004, at the beginning of Yizo Yizo's third season.

Track listing

Release history

References

2000 soundtrack albums
2002 soundtrack albums
2004 soundtrack albums
Television soundtracks